Ella Sterling Mighels (May 5, 1853 – December 10, 1934) (née: Ella Sterling Clark; during first marriage: Ella Sterling Cummins; pen name: Aurora Esmeralda) was a California pioneer, author and literary historian. She was born in Mormon Island, California, but grew up in the town of Aurora, Esmeralda County, Nevada, leading her to adopt the pen name, "Aurora Esmeralda".  She founded the California Literature Society (1913), and was named the "First Literary Historian of California" (1919).  She died in San Francisco, and is buried in Oakland, California at the Mountain View Cemetery.

Biography
Her first husband was the philologist, author, lecturer and lawyer, Adley Cummins (d. 1889); they had one child, a daughter, Genevieve (1875–1905).  Her second husband was the lawyer, newspaper artist, novelist and playwright Philip Verrill Mighels (d. 1911); they divorced 1910. Her in-laws were the US journalist and politician, Henry Rust Mighels, and the US civic leader and journalist, Nellie Verrill Mighels Davis.

Mighels published two books on California literature and its authors. In The Story of the Files (1893), Ella told of California writers, in a volume published for the California World's Fair. In Literary California, poetry, Prose and Portraits (1918), Ella published selections and portraits of California authors.

Selected publications
 Portrait of a California girl (n.d.)
 Books one ought to read (n.d.)
 The little mountain princess, a Sierra snowplant (1880)
 Explanation of Japanese village and its inhabitants (1886)
 The story of the files; a review of California writers and literature (1893)
 Bruvver Jim's baby (1904)
 San Francisco redi-vivus! An open letter to all San Franciscans and all Californians (1907)
 The full glory of Diantha (1909)
 Society and Babe Robinson; or, The streets of old San Francisco; a play. Containing also frontispiece ... introduction, biographical sketch and portrait of author, and a "Word to the reader (1914)
 Fairy tale of the white man : told from the gates of sunset (1915)
 Literary California, poetry, prose and portraits (1918)
 Wawona : an Indian story of the Northwest (1921)
 Book of the Ark-adian school (1928)
 Life and letters of a forty-niner's daughter by Aurora Esmeralda (Ella Sterling Mighels) ... (1929)

References

1853 births
1934 deaths
American literary historians
Historians of California
Historians of the American West
19th-century American women writers
19th-century American writers
20th-century American women writers
20th-century American non-fiction writers
People from Sacramento County, California
Writers from San Francisco
American women historians
People from Esmeralda County, Nevada
Women literary historians
Historians from California